Gomersal is a town in Kirklees in West Yorkshire, England. It is south of Bradford, east of Cleckheaton and north of Heckmondwike. It is close to the River Spen and forms part of the Heavy Woollen District.

History 

Gomersal was attested in the Doomes Day Book (1086) with the name Gomershale. *Guthmers Halh, is a supposed place-name, not attested in any written document, hence marked with asterisk in The Concise Oxford Dictionary of English Place-names. The location was at a bend in the brook which passes through the valley bottom before joining with the River Calder. This land became an Anglo-Saxon burial ground and most likely was the location of a Celtic temple site before the Roman Conquest. It became the site of the Parish Church of St Peter and St Paul, now known as St Peters. The brook formed the ancient boundary between Gomersal and Birstall.

The Luddite riots, that occurred in the area in 1812 provided Charlotte Brontë with material for her novel Shirley. Gomersal was the hometown of her friend Mary Taylor who lived at the Red House which she renamed Briarmains in the novel.

The Taylor Family also lived in Spen Hall, a residence in the Lower Spen area of Gomersal. Spen Hall has been divided into several houses but retains a 16th-century mullioned window, a tennis lawn and a water spring which, according to myth, is a tunnel (now flooded) leading to the Old Saw public house cellar nearby. The cellar was apparently used to hide priests fleeing persecution.

Clay pipes were found in the earlier Old Saw premises in the walls and chimneys but, once exhumed, disintegrated. A glazed drinking cup found in the foundations survives after being carefully reassembled and preserved by Harry King, the former owner of the cottage. The cup still requires dating. Its uses are disputed, with suggestions that it was a cockfighting pit or meat storage vessel.

Gomersal also has many fine and historic houses which climb the hill of Spen Lane and along Oxford Road towards Birkenshaw. Houses such as Spen Hall, Spen House (now demolished and rebuilt, except the Coach House), High Rising (High Royd, another Taylor Household) now The Gomersal Hotel, Tanfield House, Firdene (currently on the market for £1.25 million), Hilltop House (now split into two homes with apartment buildings in the grounds), Gomers Hall (apparently, originally Gothmers Hall, which was demolished to build an electricity sub-station), Pollard Hall (home of the mill owner Thomas Burnley), Red House (now Red House Museum), Broadyards, Croft House, Sigston House, Gomersal Hall, Peel House, West House (the last three still privately owned).

The old name for Cliffe Lane was Scrat Lane.

Gomersal was heavily wooded up to the late 19th century with Swinley Great Wood, Lanes Wood, Scotland (Fusden) Wood containing the Taylor family burial ground, and Church Wood between the Hill Top and Monk Ings.

During the Second World War, Gomersal had a number of public air raid shelters, with quite a few remaining in 2007 at Birkenshaw roundabout Park, Gomersal First School, Hill Top. This was likely due to the semi-underground control bunker for the anti-aircraft guns in the West Riding, protecting Leeds, Bradford, Huddersfield and Halifax. The bunker was in the grounds of Oakroyd Hall, making this a target for the German Luftwaffe; Oakroyd Hall is now the headquarters of the West Yorkshire Fire and Rescue Service.

This was active throughout the war and manned day and night. In the 1960s on the same site a nuclear-blast-proof underground bunker was constructed as a monitoring post, one of over 1,500 constructed in the UK, for use in measuring direction, strength of blast and fallout in the event of the UK coming under nuclear attack. The ROC stood down during the late 1980s with the reduced threat of the Cold War and the bunkers were abandoned and sold or given back to the land owners.

Railway 
The Lower Spen area of Gomersal had a railway station, Cleckheaton Spen on the LNWR railway line diversion loop linking Leeds and Manchester and improving the main line capacity between Huddersfield and Leeds. The line was constructed between 1894 and 1902 and opened fully to passengers in 1904. It had some spectacular civil engineering for the time, including rail viaducts at Mirfield and Heckmondwike, a  pedestrian road viaduct linking Cleckheaton town centre with the station and goods yard.

The railway closed to passengers in 1964 and goods in 1966, having had all the buildings and structures repainted and new track in 1963. In 1952, Sir Winston Churchill, then Prime Minister, slept at Cleckheaton Spen sidings overnight in a special train with a heavy security cordon during election campaigning.

Places of worship 

Gomersal has a number of places of worship given the size of population, including Gomersal St Mary C of E Church (1851), the Methodist Wesleyan Chapel, Latham Lane 1827, Grove Congregational Chapel in Oxford Road, the Methodist Free United Chapel (off Reform Street), the Primitive Methodist Chapel in Moor Lane, the Moravian Chapel in Little Gomersal and Little Gomersal Methodist Chapel on Town Hill. Most are still in use.

John Wesley preached in Gomersal. One of his closest lay assistants John Nelson was involved with lay preacher Edward Brooke who initiated the construction the Wesleyan Chapel in Latham Lane in 1827. Its unusual bow front led to it being known as the "pork pie chapel".

Street and locality names 

Gomersal also has some interesting street and place names, for example Mazy Brook (Mazebrook), Drub, Birdacre, Bleak Street, Wood Nook, Throstle Nest, Egypt, Worlds End, Fusden Lane, Monk Ings, Nutter Lane, Muffit Lane, Garfit Hill, Nibshaw Lane to name a few.

Pubs include The Peacock (demolished for the M62 Motorway), The Scotland, The Bankfield, The West End, Shoulder of Mutton (now permanently closed), White Horse (Demolished for Sainsbury's building), The Wheatsheaf, Bulls Head, The Old Saw (The Saw), and The California.
Clubs include Gomersal Cricket Club, Spen Victoria Cricket and Bowling Club, and Drub Working Men's Club.

Gomersal also has a football club, Gomersal & Cleckheaton F.C., ranging from ages 6 to 17 and their traditional colours are red and black stripes.

Gomersal was once home to Burnleys Textile Mill, which was a landmark in the Spenborough area. However, this has been demolished to make way for a new housing development of up to 300 homes. Gomersal has two primary schools; Gomersal Primary School and St Mary's First School.

Notable people 
The composer Arnold Cooke was born in Gomersal in 1906.

Gomersal is the birthplace of novelist John Barlow, who has set several works of fiction in the village.

Appearances in media 

Gomersal was the filming location for a number of scenes in the long-running period drama Heartbeat.

See also
Listed buildings in Liversedge and Gomersal

Location grid

References

External links 

 Gomersal railway station
 Gomersal railway tickets
 Gomersal and Cleckheaton FC
 5th Spen Valley, Gomersal, Scout Group
 Website of Mike Wood, the village's Member of Parliament

Villages in West Yorkshire
Heavy Woollen District
Geography of Kirklees